Tukums Municipality is a Latvian municipality situated partly in the region of Semigallia, partly in Courland and partly in Vidzeme. The municipality was formed in 2009 by merging Degole Parish, Džūkste Parish, Irlava Parish, Jaunsāti Parish, Lestene Parish, Pūre Parish, Sēme Parish, Slampe Parish, Tume Parish, Zentene Parish and Tukums town; the administrative centre being Tukums. The population in 2020 was 27,613.

On 1 July 2021, Tukums Municipality was enlarged when Engure Municipality, Jaunpils Municipality and Kandava Municipality were merged into it.

Population

Twin towns — sister cities

Tukums is twinned with:

 Andrychów, Poland
 Bnei Ayish, Israel
 Chennevières-sur-Marne, France
 Izium, Ukraine
 Karelichy, Belarus
 Krasnogorsk, Russia
 Plungė, Lithuania
 Scheeßel, Germany
 Tidaholm, Sweden

See also
 Administrative divisions of Latvia

References

 
Municipalities of Latvia
Semigallia
Courland
Vidzeme